Educational institutions in Guwahati include:

Universities
 Assam Don Bosco University
 Assam Down Town University
 Assam Science and Technology University
 Cotton University
 Gauhati University
 Lakshmibai National Institute of Physical Education, NE Regional Centre
 National Law University and Judicial Academy, Assam
 Royal Global University
 Tata Institute of Social Sciences, Guwahati Campus

Social Sciences

 Tata Institute of Social Science, Guwahati Campus
 Ascent Academy Group of Institutions, Guwahati

Dental
 Regional Dental College, Guwahati

Homoeopathic
SJN Homoeopathic Medical College and Hospital, Guwahati

Medical
 Assam Govt. Ayurvedic College, Guwahati
Gauhati Medical College and Hospital

ParaMedical
Institute of Paramedical Sciences, GMC

Law colleges

 National Law University and Judicial Academy, Assam
 BRM Government Law College
 Dispur Law College
 JB Law College
 NEF Law College
 Unique Law Institute, Guwahati.( A premier law coaching center of North East)
 University Law College, Gauhati University
 NERIM Law College, NERIM Group of Institutions

Engineering
 Assam Engineering College
 Assam Engineering Institute
 Don Bosco College of Engineering and Technology
 Girijananda Chowdhury Institute of Management and Technology
 Indian Institute of Information Technology, Guwahati
 Indian Institute of Technology Guwahati
 Institute of Science and Technology, Gauhati University
 Royal School of Engineering & Technology
 Scholar's Institute of Technology & Management

Management
 Asian Institute of Management & Technology
 Assam Institute of Management
 Department of Business Administration, Gauhati University
 Don Bosco Institute of Management
 Girijananda Chowdhury Institute of Management and Technology (GIMT)
 Institute of Strategic Business Management, (ISBM)
 NEF College of Management & Technology
 North Eastern Regional Institute of Management, (NERIM)
 Pragati School of Management
 Royal School of Business

Architecture
 Guwahati College of Architecture
 Royal School of Architecture

Hotel Management
 Assam Institute of Hotel Management, Guwahati
 IAM Institute of Hotel Management, Guwahati
Institute of Hotel Management, Guwahati (IHM)
 Pragati School of Management

Other Colleges
 Arya Vidyapeeth College (Autonomous)
 Ascent Academy Junior College, Guwahati
 B. Borooah College 
 Beinstein College of Science
 BMBB Commerce College
 Brahmaputra College
 Dispur College
 Guwahati College
 Gauhati Commerce College
 Handique Girls College
 Icon Commerce College
 Karmashree Hiteswar Saikia College
 K.C. Das Commerce College
 Lalit Chandra Bharali College
 Narengi Anchalik Mahavidyalaya
 North Gauhati College
 Oriental College of Science & Commerce, Guwahati
 Pandu College
 Pragjyotish College
 Radha Govinda Baruah College
 S.B. Deorah College
 Swadeshi College of Commerce
 West Guwahati College
 College of Veterinary Science, Khanapara

Top Schools

 Army Public School, Narangi
 Assam Jatiya Bidyalay
Ascent Academy High School, Guwahati
 Axel Public School, Guwahati
 (Cambridge) International School, Guwahati
 Central Public School, Guwahati
 Cotton Collegiate Government H.S. School, Panbazar 
Don Bosco School
 Delhi Public School, Guwahati
East Point Montessori School, Birkuchi
Faculty Higher Secondary School, Amingaon
 Fairyland School
 GEMS NPS International School, Guwahati
 Godwins Public School, Near Sarusajai, Guwahati
 Gopal Boro Government Higher Secondary School
 Gurukul Grammar Senior Secondary School
 Guwahati Public School, Batahghuli, Panjabari 
 Gyan Educational Institution
Happy Child High School, Rehabari
 Hindustani Kendriya Vidyalaya
Holy Child School Guwahati
Delhi Public School Khanapara
Kendriya Vidyalaya 9th Mile
 Kendriya Vidyalaya, Khanapara
Kendriya Vidyalaya Maligaon
 Little Flower School, Hatigaon
 Little Pearls School, Narengi Tinali, Bonda
 Maharshi Vidya Mandir
 Maria's Public School
 Miles Bronson Residential School, Guwahati
 Pearl Valley High School
 Pragjyotish Senior Secondary School, Paschim Boragaon
 PURBASHA VIDYANIKETAN
 Royal Global School
 Saint francis d' assisi senior secondary school, gurchuk guwahati
 SARALA BIRLA GYAN JYOTI
 S.B.O.A Public School, Garchuk
 Shrimanta Shankar Academy
 South Point School
 St. Stephen's School, Christian Basti
 Suderashan Public School, Khanapara
St. Mary's English High School, Guwahati
 St. Vivekananda English Academy, Maligaon
Tarini Choudhury Govt. Girls H.S. & M.P. School
 Y.W.C.A. English High School, Satribari, Guwahati
 Don Bosco School, Sonaighuli
 Don Bosco High School, Hojai

References

 
Guwahati
Assam-related lists